The El Camino Tour was a worldwide concert tour by American rock duo The Black Keys in support of their 2011 studio album, El Camino. The tour, which spanned 129 shows, began on January 23, 2012, and ended on July 13, 2013. It was the group's first tour playing arenas as a headlining act. The tour grossed $12.7 million in 2012.

Background
In December 2011, The Black Keys announced a 2012 concert tour, their first playing arenas as a headlining act. The tour opened in Europe on January 23, 2012 with three weeks of shows, before visiting North America from March to May. The tour made multiple return visits to Europe and North America throughout the year, while also visiting Australasia from October through November. In total, the group played 112 shows in 2012. Among the support acts that accompanied the band were Band of Skulls, Arctic Monkeys, and Tegan and Sara. After tickets went on sale, The Black Keys' concert at Madison Square Garden in New York City sold out in 15 minutes, resulting in the addition of a second date at the venue to satisfy demand. The tour ended on July 13, 2013, after 129 shows.

Just as it did on its previous tour, the group added bassist Gus Seyffert and keyboardist/guitarist John Wood as touring musicians in order to perform songs as close to their studio arrangements as possible. Guitarist Dan Auerbach explained the decision for the expanded live band: "It wasn't about the size of the venue. It was just that we could afford to do it and our songs deserved it. We wanted to finally present the songs like we'd written them." During the middle portion of each concert, Auerbach and drummer Patrick Carney played older material as a duo without the backing musicians. Many critics singled these performances out as the shows' highlights.

The concert stage used an austere setup with a lighting system and video projections designed by Karl Lemieux. The lighting comprised four banks of on-stage vintage spotlights, along with two disco balls and a lighted sign bearing the band's name that were lowered for the encores. Lemieux's video, which was projected onto a white sheet at the stage's rear, incorporated black-and-white footage of junkyards, deserts, and open highways. Carney explained that the band was aiming for a retro aesthetic, saying, "We kind of wanted to make the whole stage look like an old-school rock 'n' roll show, as much as possible. We're referencing bands in the '70s, what they were doing when they were playing arenas." Moreover, the footage was meant to pay homage to the group's origins. Auerbach said, "We wanted it to represent our music and the Midwest where we're from, the Rust Belt and open spaces. We find that stuff beautiful and uplifting."

Support acts
Band of Skulls (Leg 1 & 3: Europe)
Arctic Monkeys (Leg 2: North America)
Tame Impala (Leg 2: Council Bluffs)
Tegan and Sara (Leg 4: North America)
Royal Headache (Leg 5: Australia)
The Maccabees (Leg 6: Europe)
Divine Fits (Leg 7: Las Vegas)
The Flaming Lips (Leg 9: North America)

Set list
"Howlin' for You"
"Next Girl"
"Run Right Back"
"Same Old Thing"
"Dead and Gone"
"Gold on the Ceiling"
"Thickfreakness"
"Girl Is on My Mind"
"I'll Be Your Man"
"Your Touch"
"Little Black Submarines"
"Money Maker"
"Strange Times"
"Chop and Change" (North America) / "Sinister Kid" (Australasia)
"Nova Baby"
"Ten Cent Pistol"
"Tighten Up"
"Lonely Boy"
Encore
"Everlasting Light"
"She's Long Gone"
"I Got Mine"
Source:

Tour dates

Festivals and other miscellaneous performances

Box office data

References

2012 concert tours
2013 concert tours